37th Street/USC station is a busway station located in Los Angeles, California. It is situated between the LATTC/Ortho Institute and Slauson stations on the J Line, a bus rapid transit route which runs between El Monte, Downtown Los Angeles and San Pedro as part of the Metro Busway system. The station consists of two side platforms in the center of Interstate 110 above 37th Street, adjacent to the University of Southern California campus. The station serves the University Park, Exposition Park and Historic South Central neighborhoods of Los Angeles.

37th Street/USC was built between 1989 and 1997 as part of the Harbor Transitway and opened to passengers on July 28, 1997, about a year after the other stations on the transitway. J Line buses serve the station twenty-four hours a day; the headway between buses is about four minutes during peak periods, with less frequent service at other times. 37th Street/USC station is also served by several Los Angeles Metro Bus, LADOT Commuter Express, OC Bus (Orange County), and Torrance Transit bus services, most of which only run during weekday peak periods.

Location
37th Street/USC station is situated along the Harbor Transitway near the University Park, Exposition Park and Historic South-Central neighborhoods of Los Angeles. The entrances to its two side platforms are located along West 37th Street between South Flower Street and South Hope Street. The station is just east of the University of Southern California campus and Exposition Park. Inside Exposition Park are the Los Angeles Memorial Coliseum, the Banc of California Stadium, the California Science Center, the Natural History Museum of Los Angeles County, and the California African American Museum.

Station layout
37th Street/USC station consists of two  side platforms, located above a ground-level plaza along West 37th Street. The ground-level plaza includes bus boarding bays and a Transit Access Pass (TAP) ticket vending machine was added in early 2017 to support all-door boarding on the J Line.

Services

37th Street/USC station is used by the Metro J Line bus rapid transit route which runs between the El Monte Station in El Monte, Downtown Los Angeles and the Harbor Gateway Transit Center in Gardena, California, with select trips continuing onto San Pedro. The J Line is part of the Metro Busway system. 

In addition to J Line buses, the busway platforms at 37th Street/USC station are also served by the all-day Los Angeles Metro Bus route  to Disneyland. There are also several routes that use the busway, geared towards people commuting to Los Angeles, operating only during weekday rush-hours, operating towards the city in the morning and returning at night: LADOT Commuter Express route  to Redondo Beach,  to El Segundo and route  to Rancho Palos Verdes; and Torrance Transit route 4X to Torrance (also operates all-day Saturday).

37th Street/USC station is also served by several bus routes that use bus stops near to the station on surface streets: Los Angeles Metro Bus route  that runs between Eagle Rock and South Los Angeles, route  that runs between LAX and South Gate, and route  that begins near the station and runs to Echo Park; Metro Express route  to San Pedro; LADOT DASH shuttle route F that operates between Downtown Los Angeles and the station area via Figueroa Street, the King-East route that serves the Historic South Central neighborhood, and the Southeast route that serves the South Park neighborhood; and shuttles operated by the University of Southern California.

References

Los Angeles Metro Busway stations
South Los Angeles
Exposition Park (Los Angeles)
University Park, Los Angeles
Metro
J Line (Los Angeles Metro)
Transport infrastructure completed in 1996
1996 establishments in California
Bus stations in Los Angeles